Gerald Dennis Mahan (born November 24, 1937, died November 21, 2021, age 83) was an American condensed matter physicist, with specific research interests in transport and optical properties of materials, and solid-state devices. He was a fellow of the American Physical Society.

Education and career

Mahan earned an B.A. in Physics in 1959 at Harvard University, and a Ph.D. in Physics at the University of California, Berkeley in 1964.

Mahan has worked at General Electric Research Laboratory (1963–1967), and has been a professor of physics at the University of Oregon (1967–1973), Indiana University (1973–1984), University of Tennessee (1984–2001), and Pennsylvania State University (2001–present). He has also worked at Oak Ridge National Laboratory (1984–2001).

Born in Portland, Oregon Mahan graduated valedictorian from Franklin High School. He studied physics at Harvard University and graduated magna cum laude in 1959. In 1964, under John Hopfield at the University of California, Berkeley he received his PhD in physics for explaining linear dispersion in excitations. Upon graduation he became a research scientist at General Electric's Corporate Research Laboratory. He worked full-time for General Electric until 1967 and then spent another 28 years working for them part-time (one of the longest part time continuous relationships in GE research history). While at GE he pioneered the application of mathematical techniques developed by three Russians (Abrikosov, Gorkov and Dzyaloshinskii) to adapt Green's functions to theoretical solid-state physics. The solutions using this method challenged the conventional wisdom. The x-ray edge theory was part of this work. The results produced using this method, while controversial at the time, were almost universally supported by later experimental results and eventually became accepted as fundamental mathematical techniques.  Charles Duke worked closely with Mahan while they were both at GE and learned and applied these techniques leading to discoveries in the tunneling of electrons across semiconductor diodes. He is quoted in an interview as saying that "basically, Gerry taught me solid-state physics".

In 1967, Mahan became a professor of physics at the University of Oregon. While at Oregon he continued his work on the x-ray edge and expanded it to include surface science and the microscopic theory of dielectrics. He was awarded a Research Fellowship from the Alfred Sloan Foundation and spent 1970 working at the Cavendish Laboratory of Cambridge University, England. Mahan became a professor at Indiana University in 1973. During his tenure at Indiana, he expanded his areas of work to include varistors, which he did in conjunction with colleagues from GE. He developed mathematical models that explained how varistors function (they are extremely non-linear devices) leading to substantial improvements in their effectiveness. He worked closely with Lloyd Chase and did the first Raman scattering of beta-alumina which is used to make high-density solid-state batteries. He continued to expand his areas of interest and co-invented the time-dependent local density approximation (TDLDA) which built on Walter Kohn's work inventing local density approximation (LDA). He later wrote a book on the subject with Kumble Subbaswammy (a former PhD student) titled Local Density Theory of Polarizability. Subbaswammy is currently the Chancellor of the University of Massachusetts at Amherst. Mahan was committed to the development of scientific talent and had several post doctorate students while at Indiana. These included Steven Girvin (postdoc for 2 years from 1977 to 1978), Wilfried Haensch (postdoc for 2 years from 1981 to 1982), William Pardee, Ji-Wie Wu, Mats Jonson and Petter Minnhagen. Steven Girvin, who, like Mahan, received his PhD under the guidance of John Hopfield, won in 2007 the Oliver E. Buckley Prize of the American Physical Society and is the Eugene Higgins Professor of Physics at Yale University. Wilfried Haensch did pioneering work with Mahan explaining the "current drag" problem in semi-conductors and separate work with Mahan using new analytical methods to explain the Quantum Bolzmann Equation (QBE) which describes the transport of electricity in heat and solids. During his tenure at Indiana, he was invited by Stig Lundqvist of Chalmers University and the Niels Bohr Institute to spend a sabbatical year working at Chalmers in Göteborg, Sweden. This fostered a long collaboration with Chalmers and Swedish physics. In 1984 the University of Tennessee and Oak Ridge National Laboratory created a joint Distinguished Scientist program to raise the quality and profile of science in Tennessee. Mahan was recruited as the first member of that program and moved to Tennessee. He continued his research but spent much of his time as a research manager. During Lamar Alexander's tenure as President of the University of Tennessee, he recruited Mahan to teach freshman physics, which he did for ten years. At that time, there were not many members of the National Academy of Science teaching freshman physics. In 2001, Mahan was recruited to join the faculty of Penn State University as a Distinguished Professor. He expanded his areas of expertise to include thermoelectrics and thermal transport systems in nanotubes. He worked with Peter Eklund on vibrational properties of carbon nanotubes and silicon nanowires. He retired from Penn State in 2016 and served as an adjunct professor at the Massachusetts Institute Technology from 2016 until 2020. 

Mahan was recognized for his pioneering work. He was elected as a fellow of the American Physical Society (1974), member of the National Academy of Sciences (1995), American Academy of Arts and Sciences (2005), foreign member of the Royal Society of Arts and Sciences - Göteborg, Sweden (2008), and Erasmus Mundas Lecturer of the European Union (2011). He received an honorary doctorate from Chalmers University, Goteborg Sweden in 2016.

Later in his career, Mahan served as a leader of scientific organizations both in the United States and globally. He served as a General Councilor (Board of Directors) of the American Physical Society. He served as Secretary (Head) of Section III of the National Academy of Science. Section III includes Applied Math, Computer Science, Engineering and Applied Physical Science. He also served as Secretary of Section 33 (Applied Physical Science). He served as the first Chairman of the International Centre for Condensed Matter Physics (ICCMP) in Brasilia, Brazil. In his role as Chairman of ICCMP he traveled relentlessly to foster collaboration between South American and US and European physicists.

Awards

National Science Foundation Predoctoral Fellow, 1959–1961
Alfred P. Sloan Research Fellow, 1968–1970
Fellow, American Physical Society, 1974–present
Luther Dana Waterman Research Award, 1979, co-winner, Outstanding Scientist at Indiana University
Dushman Award, 1984, co-winner, General Electric Company, for development of the ZnO Varistor
Centennial Medal, Catholic University of Chile, 1989
Member, National Academy of Sciences, since 1995
Member, American Academy of Arts and Sciences, 2005
Eberly College of Science Medal, 2007
Foreign Member, Royal Society of Arts and Sciences, Göteborg, Sweden, 2008
Erasmus Mundas Lecturer of the European Union, April 2011
Outstanding Achievement in Thermoelectrics Award, International Thermoelectric Society (ITS), 2015

Selected publications

Books

  (ebook)

Papers

.

References

External links

Obituary 
Obituary

1937 births
2021 deaths
American condensed matter physicists
21st-century American physicists
Fellows of the American Physical Society
United States National Science Foundation officials
Fellows of the American Academy of Arts and Sciences
American Institute of Physics
Members of the United States National Academy of Sciences
Franklin High School (Portland, Oregon) alumni
Harvard University alumni
University of California, Berkeley alumni